Abolfazl Maghsoudlou (born 7 August 1992) is an Iranian professional Kabaddi player. He is currently playing for Bengaluru Bulls in Pro Kabaddi League Season 8.

Early life 
He was born in Golestan province of Iran.

Pro Kabaddi League
He debut in PKL in Season 3 and played for U Mumba in Season 3, Patna Pirates in Season 4. He      played for Dabang Delhi in Season 5.And currently he plays for Bengaluru Bulls.

World Cup 2016 and awards 
He played for Iran National team in the 2016 Kabaddi World Cup.

References 

1992 births
Iranian kabaddi players
Living people
Asian Games medalists in kabaddi
Kabaddi players at the 2014 Asian Games
Kabaddi players at the 2018 Asian Games
Asian Games gold medalists for Iran
Asian Games silver medalists for Iran
Medalists at the 2014 Asian Games
Medalists at the 2018 Asian Games
Pro Kabaddi League players
21st-century Iranian people